Export Import Bank of Bangladesh Limited (EXIM Bank) is one of the leading private commercial banks in Bangladesh. The Bank came into operation as a commercial bank on 3 August 1999 as per rules and regulations of Bangladesh Bank. From its establishment the bank was known as BEXIM Bank Limited. But due to legal constraints, the bank was renamed as EXIM Bank, which stood for Export Import Bank of Bangladesh Limited.

History

EXIM Bank Limited was established in 1999 by Shahjahan Kabir, founder chairman. Nazrul Islam Mazumder became the new chairman after the founding chairman died. The bank started functioning from 3 August 1999 with Alamgir Kabir, as the adviser and Mohammad Lakiotullah as the managing director. On 2009, the bank made history for being the first privately owned bank in Bangladesh to open an exchange house in the UK. The bank started its operation with an initial authorised capital of Taka 1 billion (US$12.87 million) and paid up capital of Taka 225 million (US$2.9 million).

Since then the authorised and paid up capital remained unchanged till December 2000. Later, both were increased from time to time and their amounts stood at Tk.16.12 billion (US$207.31 million) and Tk.9.22 billion (US$118.7 million) respectively on 31 December 2011. EXIM bank is the first bank in Bangladesh to have converted all of its operations of conventional banking into shariah-based banking, since July/2004.

Prime operational area
As a full-fledged Islamic bank in Bangladesh, EXIM Bank extended all Islamic banking services including wide range of saving and investment products, foreign exchange and ancillary services with the support of sophisticated IT and professional management. The investment portfolio of the bank comprises diversified areas of business and industry sectors. The sectors include textiles, edible oil, ready-made garments, chemicals, cement, telecommunication, steel, real estate and other service industry including general trade finance.

Corporate social responsibilities
In past recent years the bank has supported the poor and meritorious student's education. In 2007 about 80 students of different institutions like (DU, BUET, DMC, VNCS, and NDC) have taken scholarship. The bank sponsored the "Beautification Project" of Dhaka mega city conducted by Dhaka City Corporation.

EXIM Bank Foundation

EXIM Bank Scholarship Program
EXIM Bank Scholarship Program was launched in the year 2006 with 61 poor meritorious students selected from different reputed educational institutions of Dhaka City including Government Laboratory High School, Viqarunnisa Noon School and College, Dhaka University, BUET, Dhaka Medical College, etc. Till 30 April 2013, they have enrolled as many as 2100 students from around 350 reputed educational institutions across the country.

Exim Bank Agricultural University Bangladesh
The vulnerable features of Northern Bangladesh characterised by frequent river erosion, flood and drought, social inequalities in education & health, and migration affecting livelihoods of its poor inhabitants inspired the Bank for undertaking some initiatives for their assistance in advancement. Till then, there has been no existence of any private agricultural university in North Bengal, even though northern part of the country is densely populated and has enormous potential for agricultural development. A large portion of quality students having good results in SSC and HSC cannot get admission into public agricultural university every year. In essence, availability of admission would enable them to pursue higher education in agriculture. EXIM Bank Supports export import initiatives throughout the country. Thus, they have set up EXIM Bank Agricultural University Bangladesh (EBAUB), a private agricultural university at Chapainawabgang, Rajshahi.

EXIM Bank Hospital
A 5-storied building having 10,000 square feet of floor space at 840 Kazi Para, Rokeya Sarani, Mirpur, Dhaka-1216 has been hired to set up Exim Bank Hospital.

Awards and achievements
ICMAB Best Corporate Award 2013
International "BIZZ Award −2013"
International Diamond Prize for Excellence in Quality, a vanity award

See also

 Islamic banking

References

External links
 EXIM Bank Web site

Banks of Bangladesh
Banks established in 1999
Organizations established in 1990
Foreign trade of Bangladesh
Export credit agencies
Islamic banks of Bangladesh
Bangladeshi companies established in 1999